is a former Japanese football player.

Playing career
Omori was born in Saitama on November 9, 1976. After graduating from high school, he joined J1 League club Sanfrecce Hiroshima in 1995. However he could not play at all in the match. In 1995, he moved to Japan Football League club Tosu Futures (later Sagan Tosu). Although he could hardly play in the match in 1996, he became a regular player in 1997. In 1998, he moved to Nagoya Grampus Eight (later Nagoya Grampus). Although he could hardly play in the match until 1999, he played as regular player from 2000. He played many defensive position, mainly, defensive midfielder and side back. Although he played as regular player for a long time until 2007, he lost his opportunity to play for injury in 2008 and retired end of 2008 season.

Club statistics

References

External links

1976 births
Living people
Association football people from Saitama Prefecture
Japanese footballers
J1 League players
Japan Football League (1992–1998) players
Sanfrecce Hiroshima players
Sagan Tosu players
Nagoya Grampus players
Association football midfielders